Pentanema is a genus of Asian and African plants in the tribe Inuleae within the family Asteraceae.

Species
The following species are recognised in the genus Pentanema:

Formerly included
In 2018, the Vicoa genus was re-erected due to molecular analysis.

 Pentanema albertoregelium (C.Winkl.) Gorschk. → Vicoa albertoregelia
 Pentanema cernuum (Dalzell) Ling → Vicoa cernua
 Pentanema chodzhakasiani Kinzik. → Vicoa chodzhakasiani
 Pentanema discoideum Nabiev → Vicoa discoidea
 Pentanema glanduligerum (Krasch.) Gorschk. → Vicoa glanduligera
 Pentanema indicum (L.) - → Vicoa indica
 Pentanema krascheninnikovii (Kamelin) Czerep. → Vicoa krascheninnikovii
 Pentanema ligneum Mesfin → Vicoa lignea
 Pentanema multicaule Boiss. → Vicoa multicaulis
 Pentanema parietarioides (Nevski) Gorschk. → Vicoa parietarioides
 Pentanema propinquum Nevski → Vicoa propinqua
 Pentanema varzobicum Kamelin & Kinzik. → Vicoa varzobica
 Pentanema vestitum (Wall. ex DC.) Ling → Vicoa vestita

References

 
Asteraceae genera
Plants described in 1818
Taxa named by Henri Cassini